The 1974 New England Patriots season was the franchise's 5th season in the National Football League and 15th overall. The Patriots ended the season with a record of seven wins and seven losses and finished tied for third in the AFC East Division. The Pats stunned the Super Bowl Champion Miami Dolphins in Week 1 at Schaffer Stadium. The Pats went on to win their first five games on their way to a 6–1 start. However, they struggled in the second half, winning only one game before finishing with a 7–7 record.

Offseason

NFL Draft

Staff

Roster

Regular season 

The Patriots posted their first non-losing season since 1966, finishing 7–7. They erupted to a 5–0 start before losing seven of their last nine games due to injuries and rising strength of opponents as the season went on. A league-wide player strike during training camp and preseason allowed a large number of new players to make the squad, as coach Chuck Fairbanks was installing a new offensive system.

Schedule 

Note: Intra-division opponents are in bold text.

Standings

Notable games 

 September 15 vs. Miami Dolphins:

The Patriots ended a four-game losing streak to Miami, erupting to a 31–10 third quarter lead and cruising home 34–24. Mack Herron opened the season for the Patriots with a fourteen-yard rushing touchdown in the first quarter, while Jim Plunkett had a touchdown throw to Reggie Rucker and a five-yard rushing score to go with Sam Cunningham's 13-yard rushing score.

 September 22 vs. New York Giants at Yale:

The Patriots traveled to New Haven, Connecticut to face the Giants. Norm Snead of the Giants opened the scoring with a 21-yard touchdown to Ron A. Johnson; the Patriots answered with a 12-yarder from Jim Plunkett to Mack Herron, both scores coming in the first quarter. In the second Joe Dawkins of the Giants punched the ball in from one yard out, and the Patriots tied the game as Plunkett found Randy Vataha from 38 yards out. New England then took over as Sam Cunningham caught a 14-yard Plunkett pass and Herron later ran in a four-yard score. Johnson caught another touchdown from Snead in the fourth quarter but the PAT was stopped and the Patriots ended the game 28–20 winners.

 October 20 at Buffalo Bills:

The Bills ended the Patriots' five-game winning streak 30–28. O. J. Simpson had one rushing touchdown and a catch from Joe Ferguson, who also completed touchdown throws to Paul Seymour. Sam Cunningham had three rushing scores and Jim Plunkett fired a 12-yard touchdown bullet to Reggie Rucker with nine seconds left. The Bills recovered the ensuing onside kick to preserve the win.

 October 27 at Minnesota Vikings:

With both teams entering the game at 5–1, turnovers plagued the day at Metropolitan Stadium. Jim Plunkett was picked off twice and the Patriots fumbled twice, while Fran Tarkenton had three picks. The Patriots also had nine penalties eating up 122 yards as the Vikings erased an early 10–0 New England lead and led 14–10 in the final minute; Tarkenton ran in a late touchdown, then threw the ball into the face of Ron Bolton after he tripped on a camera cable and mistakenly believed Bolton tripped him; a brief brawl ensued and both Bolton and Tarkenton were ejected. But Jim Plunkett drove the Pats down field and fired a ten-yard game-winning touchdown to Bob Windsor on the final play; Windsor had to break numerous tackles to reach the endzone and was injured for the season as a result.

 November 3 vs. Buffalo Bills:

The Patriots and Bills squared off in another hard-fought affair as Joe Ferguson threw for 247 yards and a touchdown to Ahmad Rashad while O. J. Simpson was held in check until late in the first half with a touchdown. Jim Plunkett threw two touchdowns to Mack Herron and Sam Cunningham rushed in another score for a 21–19 Patriots half time lead, but the Bills struck first in the third quarter when Dave Washington picked off Plunket and ran back 72 yards for the score. Another Mack Herron score and John Leypoldt's third field goal of the day left the score 29–28 in the final minute when the Patriots drove down field for a field goal, but the kick was blocked by Jeff Yeates of the Bills, preserving the win.

References 

New England Patriots
New England Patriots seasons
New England Patriots
Sports competitions in Foxborough, Massachusetts